The women's 4 × 170 metres relay event at the 1973 European Athletics Indoor Championships was held on 10 March in Rotterdam. Each athlete ran one lap of the 170 metres track.

Results

References

4 × 400 metres relay at the European Athletics Indoor Championships
Relay